Manu Shlomovich (1927–2000) was an Israeli footballer who played for Juventus and Maccabi Netanya.

Both of his sons Eliezer and Moshe also played football, both played together in Maccabi Netanya.

References

1927 births
2000 deaths
Romanian Jews
20th-century Israeli Jews
Israeli footballers
Juventus F.C. players
Maccabi Netanya F.C. players
Association footballers not categorized by position
Romanian emigrants to Israel